Norsälven is a river flowing between Fryken and Vänern in Värmland, Sweden. It used to be an important river for log driving. During the 1950s, there were 6.23 million logs annually floating in the river. The length is 28 km (including Ljusnan River, 179 km).

References

Rivers of Värmland County